This is a list of people who have made noteworthy contributions to cosmology (the study of the history and large-scale structure of the universe) and their cosmological achievements

A 
 Tom Abel (1970–) studied primordial star formation
 Roberto Abraham (1965–) studied the shapes of early galaxies
 Andreas Albrecht studied the formation of the early universe, cosmic structure, and dark energy
 Hannes Alfvén (1908–1995) theorized that galactic magnetic fields could be generated by plasma currents
 Ralph A. Alpher (1921–2007) argued that observed proportions of hydrogen and helium in the universe could be explained by the big bang model, predicted cosmic background radiation
 Aristarchus of Samos (310–230 BC) early proponent of heliocentrism
 Aristotle (circa 384–322 BC) posited a geocentric cosmology that was widely accepted for many centuries
 Aryabhata (476–550) described a geocentric model with slow and fast epicycles

B 
 Ja'far ibn Muhammad Abu Ma'shar al-Balkhi (787–886) conveyed Aristotle's theories from Persia to Europe
 James M. Bardeen (1939–2022) studied the mathematics of black holes and of vacua under general relativity
 John D. Barrow (1952–2020) popularized the anthropic cosmological principle
 Charles L. Bennett (1956–) studied the large-scale structure of the universe by mapping irregularities in microwave background radiation
 Orfeu Bertolami (1959–) studied the cosmological constant, inflation, dark energy-dark matter unification and interaction, alternative gravity theories
 Somnath Bharadwaj (1964–) studied large-scale structure formation
 James Binney (1950–) studied galactic dynamics and supernova disruption of galactic gasses
 Martin Bojowald (1973–) studied loop quantum gravity and established loop quantum cosmology
 Hermann Bondi (1919–2005) developed the steady-state model
 Mustapha Ishak Boushaki (1967–) physicist researcher on Cosmology
 Tycho Brahe (1546–1601) promoted a geo-heliocentric system of epicycles
 Robert Brandenberger (1956–) formulated the theory of string gas cosmology, with colleague Cumrun Vafa, and developed cosmological perturbation theory

C 
 Bernard J. Carr (1949–) promoted the anthropic principle, studied primordial black holes
 Sean M. Carroll (1966–) researched dark energy, general relativity, and spontaneous inflation
 Gennady V. Chibisov (1946–2008) origin of cosmological density perturbations from quantum fluctuations
 Peter Coles (1963–) modeled galactic clustering and authored several cosmology books
 C. B. Collins used the anthropic principle to solve the flatness problem
 Asantha Cooray (1973–) studied dark energy, halo models of large structure, and cosmic microwave radiation
 Nicolaus Copernicus (1473–1543) formulated a heliocentric cosmology

D 
 Paul Davies (1946–) developed a vacuum model that explains microwave background fluctuation, studies time's arrow, and has written many popular-press books
 Marc Davis (1947–) was lead astronomer of a survey of 50,000 high-redshift galaxies
 Avishai Dekel (1951–) studied galaxy formation and large scale structure in dark matter-dark energy dominated universes
 Robert H. Dicke (1916–1997) measured background radiation, used an early version of the anthropic principle to relate the gravitational constant to the age of the universe
 Mike J. Disney (1937–) discovered low surface brightness galaxies

E 

 George Efstathiou (Cosmologist) (1955–)  pioneering computer simulations, observations of galaxy clustering and studies of the fluctuations in the cosmic microwave background
 Jürgen Ehlers (1929–2008) described gravitational lensing and studied the mathematical implications of an isotropic microwave background
 Jaan Einasto (1929–) studied structure in the large-scale distribution of superclusters of galaxies, early proponent of dark matter
 Albert Einstein (1879–1955) introduced general relativity and the cosmological constant
 George F. R. Ellis (1939–) theorized a cylindrical steady-state universe with a naked singularity as recycling mechanism
 Richard S. Ellis (1950–) used gravitational lensing and high-redshift supernovae to study the origin of galaxies, large scale structure, and dark matter

F 
 Sandra M. Faber (1944–) discovered the Great Attractor, a supercluster-scale gravitational anomaly; co-inventor of the theory of cold dark matter
 Hume A. Feldman (1953–) studies cosmological perturbations and the statistical and dynamical properties of the large scale structure of the universe
 Pedro G. Ferreira (1968–) his main interests are in general relativity and theoretical cosmology
 Carlos S. Frenk (1951–) studied cosmic structure formation
 Alexander Friedmann (1888–1925) discovered the expanding-universe solution to general relativity

G
George Gamow (1904–1968) argued that observed proportions of hydrogen and helium in the universe could be explained by the big bang model, modeled the mass and radius of primordial galaxies
Margaret J. Geller (1947–) discovered the Great Wall, a superstructure-scale filament of galaxies
Thomas Gold (1920–2004) proposed the steady-state theory
Gerson Goldhaber (1924–2010) used supernova observations to measure the energy density of the universe
J. Richard Gott (1947–) proposed the use of cosmic strings for time travel
Alan Guth (1947–) explained the isotropy of the universe by theorizing a phase of exponential inflation soon after the big bang

H 
 Stephen W. Hawking (1942–2018) described singularities in general relativity and developed singularity-free models of the big bang; predicted primordial black holes
 Charles W. Hellaby described models of general relativity with nonconstant metric signature
 Michał Heller (1936–) researched noncommutative approaches to quantum gravity
 Robert C. Herman (1914–1997) predicted the background radiation temperature
 Lars Hernquist (1954–) studied galaxy formation and evolution
 Chris Hirata (1982–) researched weak gravitational lensing
 Honorius Augustodunensis (c.1080−1151) wrote a popular encyclopedia of cosmology, geography, and world history
 Hanns Hörbiger (1860–1931) formulated a pseudoscientific theory of ice as the basic substance of all cosmic processes
 Fred Hoyle (1915–2001) promoted the steady state theory, used the anthropic principle to explain the energy levels of carbon nuclei
 Edwin P. Hubble (1889–1953) demonstrated the existence of other galaxies and confirmed the relation between redshift and distance
 John P. Huchra (1948–2010) discovered the Great Wall, a superstructure-scale filament of galaxies

I 
 Mustapha Ishak Boushaki (1967–) physicist researcher on Cosmology
 Jamal Nazrul Islam (1939–2013) published seven books on Cosmology

K 
 Ronald Kantowski (1939–) discovered spatially homogeneous but anisotropic solutions to general relativity
 Johannes Kepler (1571–1630) pioneered heliocentrism, discovered elliptical planetary motion, attempted to explain heavenly motions through physical causes
 Isaak Markovich Khalatnikov (1919–2021) conjectured an oscillatory model with an essential singularity for the evolution of the universe
 Tom W. B. Kibble (1932–2016) introduced the concept of cosmic strings
 Robert Kirshner (1949–) discovered the Boötes void, a large region sparsely populated with galaxies, and wrote a popular book on cosmology
 Edward Kolb (1951–) studied big bang cosmology including the emergence of baryons and dark matter, and wrote a popular textbook on cosmology
 Lawrence M. Krauss (1954–) author of popular science books on cosmology including A Universe from Nothing

L 
 Ofer Lahav (1959–) studied dark matter and dark energy
 Tod R. Lauer (1957–) catalogued massive black holes at galaxy centers and correlated their mass with other properties of the galaxies' structures
 Georges Henri Lemaître (1894–1966) proposed the big bang theory and the distance-redshift relation
 Janna Levin (1967–) seeks evidence for a bounded universe of nontrivial topology
 Andrew R. Liddle (1965–) studied inflationary models, wrote two books on inflation and primordial inhomogeneities
 Evgeny M. Lifshitz (1915–1985) conjectured an oscillatory model with an essential singularity for the evolution of the universe
 Andrei Linde (1948–) pioneered inflationary models and proposed eternal chaotic inflation of universes from the false vacuum
 Abraham Loeb (1962–) researched primordial stars, primordial black holes, quasars, reionization, gravitational lensing, and gamma-ray bursts
 Jean-Pierre Luminet (1951–) studied black holes and the topology of the Universe
 David H. Lyth (1940–) studied particle cosmology, wrote two books on inflation and primordial inhomogeneities

M 
 João Magueijo (1967–) proposed much faster speeds of light in the young universe as an alternative explanation to inflation for its homogeneity
 Richard Massey (1977–) mapped dark matter in the universe
 Charles W. Misner (1932–) studied solutions to general relativity including the mixmaster universe and Misner space, wrote influential text on gravitation
 John Moffat (1932–) proposed much faster speeds of light in the young universe, developed antisymmetric theories of gravity
 Lauro Moscardini (1961–) modeled galaxy clustering in the early universe

N 
 Jayant Narlikar (1938–) promoted steady state theories
 Isaac Newton (1642–1727) formulated the law of universal gravitation and supported the heliocentric model

P 
 György Paál (1934–1992) in the late 1950s studied the quasar and galaxy cluster distributions, in 1970 from redshift quantization came up with the idea that the Universe might have nontrivial topological structure
 Thanu Padmanabhan (1957–2021) studied quantum gravity and quantum cosmology
 Leonard Parker (1938–) established the study of quantum field theory within general relativity
 P. James E. Peebles (1935–) predicted cosmic background radiation, contributed to structure theory, developed models that avoid dark matter
 Roger Penrose (1931–) linked singularities to gravitational collapse, conjectured the nonexistence of naked singularities, and used gravitational entropy to explain homogeneity
 Arno Penzias (1933–) was the first to observe the cosmic background radiation
 Saul Perlmutter (1959–) used supernova observations to measure the expansion of the universe
 Mark M. Phillips (1951–) used supernova observations to discover acceleration in the expansion of the universe, calibrated the supernova distance scale
 Joel Primack (1945–) co-invented the theory of cold dark matter
 Ptolemy (90–168) wrote the only surviving ancient text on astronomy, conjectured a model of the universe as a set of nested spheres with epicycles

Q 
 Ali Qushji (1403–1474) challenged Aristotelian physics, in particular presenting empirical evidence against a stationary Earth, and may have influenced Copernicus

R 
 Lisa Randall (1962-) contributed to Randall–Sundrum models, which describe the world in terms of a warped geometry higher-dimensional universe
 Martin Rees (1942–) proposed that quasars are powered by black holes, disproved steady state by studying distribution of quasars
 Yoel Rephaeli used the distortion of the cosmic background by high-energy electrons to infer the existence of galaxy clusters
 Adam Riess (1969–) found evidence in supernova data that the expansion of the universe is accelerating and confirming dark energy models
 Wolfgang Rindler (1924–2019) coined the phrase "event horizon", Rindler Coordinates, and popularized the use of spinors (with Roger Penrose)
 Howard P. Robertson (1903–1961) solved the two-body problem in an approximation to general relativity, developed the standard model of general relativity
 Vera Rubin (1928–2016) discovered discrepancies in galactic rotation rates leading to the theory of dark matter

S 
 Rainer K. Sachs (1932–) discovered gravitationally induced redshifts in the cosmic background radiation
 Carl Sagan (1934–1996)
 Andrei Sakharov (1921–1989) invented the theory of twins, CPT-symmetric universes
 Allan Sandage (1936–2010) set the cosmological distance scale and accurately estimated the speed of expansion of the universe
 Brian P. Schmidt (1967–) used supernova data to measure the acceleration in the expansion of the universe
 David N. Schramm (1945–1997) was an expert on big bang theory and an early proponent of dark matter
 Dennis W. Sciama (1926–1999) studied many aspects of cosmology and supervised many other leading cosmologists
 Irving Segal (1918–1998) created chronometric cosmology with alternative explanation of redshift in spectra of distant sources
 Seleucus of Seleucia (c.190–c.150 BC) used tidal observations to support a heliocentric model
 Roman Ulrich Sexl (1939–1986) developed an ether-based theory of absolute simultaneity that is mathematically equivalent to special relativity
 Al-Sijzi (c. 945–1020) invented an astrolabe based on the Earth's rotation
 Joseph Silk (1942–) explained the homogeneity of the early universe using photon diffusion damping
 Willem de Sitter (1872–1934) developed a theory of dark matter with Einstein, found an expanding matterless solution to general relativity
 Vesto Slipher (1875–1969) performed the first measurements of radial velocities for galaxies, providing the empirical basis for the expansion of the universe
 Lee Smolin (1955–) studied quantum gravity, popularized a theory of cosmological natural selection
 George F. Smoot (1945–) used Cosmic Background Explorer Satellite to measure the temperature and anisotropy of the early universe
 David N. Spergel (1961–) used Wilkinson Microwave Anisotropy Probe satellite to measure the temperature and anisotropy of the early universe
 Paul Steinhardt (1952–) pioneered inflationary cosmology, introduced first example of eternal inflation, introduced quintessential dark energy, introduced the concept of strongly self-interacting dark matter, studied brane cosmology and cyclic models of the universe
 Abd al-Rahman al-Sufi (903–986) wrote the Book of Fixed Stars, which lists over forty constellations and the stars within them
 Nicholas B. Suntzeff (1952–) used supernova observations to discover acceleration in the expansion of the universe, calibrated the supernova distance scale
 Rashid Sunyaev (1943–) developed a theory of density fluctuations in the early universe, described how to use cosmic background distortion to observe large-scale density fluctuations
 Alex Szalay (1949–) was working on structure formation in a neutrino-dominated universe, biased galaxy formation in a cold dark matter dominated universe and computing the power spectrum in hot, cold and warm dark matter dominated universes

T 
 Max Tegmark (1967–) determined the parameters of the lambda-cold dark matter model using Sloan Survey data, studied mathematical models of multiverses
 Trinh Xuan Thuan (1948–) researched galaxy formation and evolution
 William G. Tifft theorized that galactic redshifts are quantized
 Beatrice Tinsley (1941–1981) researched galactic evolution, the creation of lightweight elements, and accelerated expansion of the universe
 Frank J. Tipler (1947–) proved that time travel requires singularities, promoted the anthropic principle
 Richard C. Tolman (1881–1948) showed that the cosmic background keeps a black-body profile as the universe expands
 Mark Trodden (1968–) studied cosmological implications of topological defects in field theories
 Michael S. Turner (1949–) coined the term dark energy
 Neil Turok (1958–) predicted correlations between polarization and temperature anisotropy in the cosmic background, explained the big bang as a brane collision
 Henry Tye (1947–) proposed brane-antibrane interactions as a cause of inflation

V 
 Alexander Vilenkin (1949–) showed that eternal inflation is generic, studied cosmic strings, theorized the creation of the universe from quantum fluctuations

W 
 Robert M. Wald (1947–) wrote a popular textbook on general relativity, studied the thermodynamics of black holes and created an axiomatic formulation of quantum field theory in curved spacetime.
 Arthur Geoffrey Walker (1909–2001) developed the standard model of general relativity and studied the mathematics of relativistic reference frames
 David Wands studied inflation, superstrings, and density perturbations in the early universe
 Yun Wang (1964–) uses supernova and galactic redshift data to probe dark energy
 Jeffrey Weeks (1956–) used cosmic background patterns to determine the topology of the universe
 Simon D. White (1951–) studied galaxy formation in the lambda-cold dark matter model
 David Todd Wilkinson (1935–2002) used satellite probes to measure the cosmic background radiation
 Edward L. Wright (1947–) promoted big bang theories, studied the effect of dust absorption on measurements of the cosmic background

Z 
 Yakov Borisovich Zel'dovich (1914–1987) used accretion disks of massive black holes to explain quasars, predicted Compton scattering of the cosmic background
 Fritz Zwicky (1898–1974) along with Walter Baade coined the term "supernova", contributions in understanding neutron stars, supernovae as standard candles, gravitational lensing, and dark matter.

See also 
 Timeline of cosmological theories

 
Cosmologists, List of
Physical cosmology
Cosmologists